Rowan Lancaster Human (born 21 January 2001) is a South African professional soccer player who plays as a midfielder for Maritzburg United.

Career
In 2020, Human signed for Israeli top-flight side Maccabi Tel Aviv on a one-year contract, but was sent on loan to Israeli second division side Beitar Tel Aviv.

References

External links
 Rowan Human at Soccerway

2001 births
Living people
South African soccer players
Bidvest Wits F.C. players
Beitar Tel Aviv Bat Yam F.C. players
Maccabi Tel Aviv F.C. players
Liga Leumit players
South African Premier Division players
Expatriate footballers in Israel
South African expatriate sportspeople in Israel
Association football midfielders